The 2009 World Women's Curling Championship (branded as 2009 Mount Titlis World Women's Curling Championship for sponsorship reasons) was held in Gangneung, South Korea from March 21 to 29.

Qualification
 (Host country)
 (Defending champion)
 (Pacific champion)
 (Americas region)
 Top 8 finishers from the 2008 European Curling Championships:

 - winner of challenge series vs

Teams

Round robin standings

Round robin results
All times local (UTC +9 or Korean Standard Time)

Draw 1
March 21, 2009

Draw 2
March 21, 2009

Draw 3
March 22, 2009

Draw 4
March 22, 2009

Draw 5
March 22, 2009

Draw 6
March 23, 2009

Draw 7
March 23, 2009

Draw 8
March 23, 2009

Draw 9
March 24, 2009

Draw 10
March 24, 2009

Draw 11
March 24, 2009

Draw 12
March 25, 2009

Draw 13
March 25, 2009

Draw 14
March 25, 2009

Draw 15
March 26, 2009 1000

Draw 16
March 26, 2009 1500

Draw 17
March 26, 2009 2000

Playoffs

1 vs. 2
March 27, 2009 2000

3 vs. 4
March 28, 2009 1400

Semifinal
March 28, 2009 1900

Bronze medal game
March 29, 2009 1000

Gold medal game
March 29, 2009 1500

Player percentages
Top five percentages per position during the round robin.

External links
 

World Women's Curling Championship
Mount Titlis World Women's Curling Championship, 2009
Sports competitions in Gangneung
Women's curling competitions in South Korea
International curling competitions hosted by South Korea
2009 in South Korean women's sport
March 2009 sports events in Asia